Längenbühl is a village in the canton of Bern, Switzerland. The former municipality of the district of Thun merged with Forst on January 1, 2007 to form Forst-Längenbühl.

There are three smaller lakes in Längenbühl: Dittligsee, Geistsee and a smaller pond.

References

Former municipalities of the canton of Bern